The Tasmanian Government Railways C class is a class of 2-6-0 steam locomotives operated by the Tasmanian Government Railways.

History
Between 1885 and 1892, the Tasmanian Government Railways took delivery of 19 C class locomotives from Beyer, Peacock & Co, Manchester. A further eight followed in the early years of the 20th century. A 28th originally built for the Emu Bay Railway was purchased second hand in 1937. They were the first of what became almost an Australian  standard, as locomotives of similar design served in large numbers as the Silverton Tramway Y class, South Australian Railways Y class and Western Australian Government Railways G class, and also in Queensland and on the North Australia Railway.

In 1912, six (16-19, 26 & 27) were rebuilt with new cylinders, Belpair boilers and larger smokeboxes and reclassified as the CC class. In 1924, a further four (21, 23-25) were rebuilt also receiving Walschaerts valve gear and reclassified as the CCS class.

In 1948, a further seven locomotives of the same design were purchased from the Commonwealth Railways. These had originally been built as South Australian Railways Y class locomotives and sold to the Commonwealth Railways to operate North Australia Railway services in World War II. Four entered service as the F class, with the other three used for parts.

Preservation
Four have been preserved:
C1 at the West Coast Pioneers Museum, Zeehan
C22 at the Tasmanian Transport Museum, Glenorchy restored to service 1983, withdrawn for overhaul 1999 returned to service November 2009
CCS23 at the Don River Railway, Devonport
CCS25 at the Don River Railway, Devonport

References

Beyer, Peacock locomotives
Railway locomotives introduced in 1885
Steam locomotives of Tasmania
3 ft 6 in gauge locomotives of Australia
2-6-0 locomotives